Giuseppe Caso (born 9 December 1998) is an Italian professional footballer who plays as a forward for  club Frosinone.

Club career

Fiorentina 
Born in Torre Annunziata, Caso was a youth exponent of Fiorentina.

Loan to Cuneo 
On 19 August 2018, Caso was signed by Serie C club Cuneo on a season-long loan deal. On 17 September he made his professional debut in Serie C for Cuneo in a 1–0 away defeat against Pisa, he was replaced by Hchiam Kanis after 46 minutes. Ten days later, on 27 September, he was sent off with a double yellow card in the 79th minute of a 4–0 away defeat against Juventus U23. On 2 December he played his first entire match for the team, a 2–0 home defeat against Pontedera. Eight days later, on 10 December, he scored his first professional goal in the 79th minute of a 1–0 away win over Pro Vercelli. Caso ended his loan to Cuneo with 30 appearances, 1 goal and 2 assists.

Arezzo 
On 12 July 2019, Caso joined to Serie C club Arezzo on a free-transfer and a 2-year contract. On 11 August he made his debut for the club as a substitute replacing Mattia Rolando in the 53rd minute of a 4–3 away defeat against Crotone in the second round of Coppa Italia. Two weeks later, on 25 August he made his league debut for Arezzo as a substitute replacing Walid Cheddira in the 65th minute of a 3–1 home win over Lecco. On 23 October, Caso played his first match as a starter or Arezzo, a 1–1 away draw against Pro Vercelli, he was replaced by Aniello Cutolo in the 61st minute. Four days later, on 27 October, he scored his first goal for the club in the 63rd minute of a 2–0 home win over Giana Erminio. On 10 November he played his first entire match for the club, a 2–1 home win over Olbia.

Genoa 
On 14 September 2020, he moved to Serie A club Genoa. On 14 December 2020, he made his Serie A debut in a 1–3 home loss against Juventus.

Loan to Cosenza 
On 20 August 2021 he went to Cosenza on loan.

Frosinone
On 16 July 2022, Caso moved to Frosinone on a three-year deal.

Career statistics

References

External links
 

Living people
1998 births
People from Torre Annunziata
Footballers from Campania
Italian footballers
Association football forwards
A.C. Cuneo 1905 players
S.S. Arezzo players
Genoa C.F.C. players
Cosenza Calcio players
Frosinone Calcio players
Serie A players
Serie B players
Serie C players